The lesser shrike-tyrant (Agriornis murinus) is a species of bird in the family Tyrannidae.
It breeds in Patagonia; it winters to northern  Argentina, Bolivia and Paraguay.
Its natural habitat is subtropical or tropical dry shrubland.

References

lesser shrike-tyrant
Birds of Argentina
Birds of Patagonia
lesser shrike-tyrant
Taxonomy articles created by Polbot
Taxa named by Frédéric de Lafresnaye
Taxa named by Alcide d'Orbigny